Trzebiechowo may refer to the following villages in Poland:
Trzebiechowo, Pomeranian Voivodeship
Trzebiechowo, West Pomeranian Voivodeship